Oppelo   is a city in Conway County, Arkansas, United States. The population was 781 at the 2010 census.

Geography
Oppelo is located near the southern border of Conway County at  (35.102495, -92.768276).

Demographics

As of the census of 2000, there were 725 people, 258 households, and 204 families residing in the city. The racial makeup of the city was 98.76% White, 0.14% Black or African American, 0.83% from other races, and 0.28% from two or more races.  2.48% of the population were Hispanic or Latino of any race.

There were 258 households, out of which 41.1% had children under the age of 18 living with them, 67.8% were married couples living together, 7.4% had a female householder with no husband present, and 20.9% were non-families. 16.7% of all households were made up of individuals, and 7.0% had someone living alone who was 65 years of age or older.  The average household size was 2.81 and the average family size was 3.17.

In the city, the population was spread out, with 28.4% under the age of 18, 9.5% from 18 to 24, 28.8% from 25 to 44, 20.6% from 45 to 64, and 12.7% who were 65 years of age or older.  The median age was 32 years. For every 100 females, there were 103.7 males.  For every 100 females age 18 and over, there were 98.1 males.

The median income for a household in the city was $32,202, and the median income for a family was $41,667. Males had a median income of $32,083 versus $19,167 for females. The per capita income for the city was $18,674.  About 10.1% of families and 13.2% of the population were below the poverty line, including 19.1% of those under age 18 and 9.8% of those age 65 or over.

References

Cities in Conway County, Arkansas
Cities in Arkansas
Arkansas placenames of Native American origin